Runaway Pond is a marsh at the former site of Long Pond in Glover, Vermont. The name arose from an environmental disaster in 1810, when a manual attempt to divert some of the water of Long Pond broke the bank, causing the entire lake to suddenly empty out into the Barton River, uncontrolled.

Hydrology 
An engineer estimated that Long Pond must have contained  of water.

With a surface area of 480 acres, Long Pond exceeded the 100-acre guideline to be considered a lake by today's standards.

History 
On June 6, 1810 it was a dry summer and the Barton River, which supplied the power for grist mills in Glover and northward, was running very low. At the request of Arron Willson, the local Glover gristmill owner, 60 men and boys attempted to create a new north outlet from Long Pond to the Barton River, but instead, they unintentionally caused the banks of the pond to give way. This resulted in a flood throughout the Barton River Valley.

The initial surge took trees and huge boulders with it, building up a logjam, which stopped the flood temporarily until the water pressure behind the jam built up, causing a breakthrough. This scenario kept recurring in the flood's progress down to Barton.

One of the laborers, Spencer Chamberlain, ran ahead of the flood just in time to save Arron Willson's wife, working at the mill. There were no deaths.

The water ran out of the pond in 1 hour and 15 minutes, but the mud ran out for hours. The water reached Lake Memphremagog in 4 hours and reportedly raised the level there .

The disaster, and the former location of the wayward pond was thereafter called "Runaway Pond."

Legacy 

The Runaway Pond is a simple and straightforward example of a disaster to the natural environment inadvertently caused by human activity.

The results of the flood can still be seen today at Clark Pond which is just north of the Runaway Pond site, and elsewhere in the Barton River valley.

Chamberlain's act is commemorated each year on Glover Day (the last Saturday of July) by a  road race following the path of the flood.

On June 4, 5, and 6, 2010, the Glover Historical Society sponsored a celebration of the Runaway Pond event.

Footnotes

External links
 Alexander, Wayne Runaway Pond: The Complete Story; A Compendium of Resources. The Glover Historical Society and The Little House Desktop Publishing, 2006.
 Glover Township Information (includes description of Long Pond and the Runaway incident, Gazetteer of Lamoille and Orleans Counties, VT.; 1883-1884, Compiled and Published by Hamilton Child; May 1887
 Glover, Vt. (includes "an account of the running off of Long Pond"), Hayward's New England Gazetteer, Eighth Edition, 1839 scan and transcript of actual page. 

Glover, Vermont
Barton (village), Vermont
History of Vermont
Lakes of Vermont
Environmental disasters
Former lakes of the United States
Lakes of Orleans County, Vermont
Floods in the United States
Disasters in Vermont
1810 in Vermont